Danira Gović (also billed as Danira Govich; born (billed 1972/1973)) is a Croatian actress, best known for a recurring role in the British television comedy-drama series Hotel Babylon.

Biography

After having finished her education in a secondary economic school in her native city of Šibenik, Danira arrived in London in 1993, where she initially worked as a babysitter.

Her temporary job turned into a permanent residence in Britain. After babysitting, she worked for a while in a store, selling bras, and then she got a waitressing job in London's Royal National Theatre, where she observed various actors and plays. She went to an audition and got accepted, gaining a scholarship to cover her costs of education.

After many tries, she was in the right place at the right time: she got a role in BBC series Hotel Babylon, playing Croatian chambermaid Tanja Mihajlov and then she got promoted to Head of Housekeeping after former Head of Housekeeping Jackie Clunes played by Natalie Mendoza left.

She has also played a noticed role in Zabranjena ljubav, on RTL Televizija in Croatia, as Angelina, a reticent hairdresser.

Filmography

Film roles

Television roles

References

 http://www.jutarnji.hr/glumica-danira-govic-nosi-desetomjesecnu-bebu-u-sling-amazonas-nosiljci/945242/
 http://www.jutarnji.hr/-u-engleskoj-sam-bila-glavna-zvijezda-u-bbc-ovoj-seriji-hotel-babylon--a-u-hrvatskoj-nemam-posla--/1158507/

External links
 

Living people
Croatian emigrants to England
Croatian actresses
People from Šibenik
1973 births